Jingxing Mining District is a mining district and one of eight districts of the prefecture-level city of Shijiazhuang, the capital of Hebei Province, North China. It is an enclave of Jingxing County.

Administrative divisions
There are 2 subdistricts, 2 towns, and 1 township in the district.

Subdistricts:
Kuangshi Subdistrict, Siwei Subdistrict

Towns:
Jiazhuang, Fengshan

The only township is Hengjian

External links

County-level divisions of Hebei
Shijiazhuang